Logan Weston (born 3 July 1992) is an English cricketer. He is a right-handed batsman and a right-arm off break bowler. He made his first-class debut for Leeds/Bradford MCCU against Sussex on 2 April 2015.

References

External links

1992 births
Living people
English cricketers
Leeds/Bradford MCCU cricketers
Cricketers from Bradford
Cumberland cricketers
English cricketers of the 21st century